The Mexico City Mexico Temple (formerly the Mexico City Temple) is the 28th constructed and 26th operating temple of the Church of Jesus Christ of Latter-day Saints (LDS Church).

It is located in the north-eastern part of the Mexican capital, Mexico City. The architecture is influenced by the Mayan Revival style, and includes both Aztec and Mayan elements. It is the largest temple outside the United States.

History
The Mexico City Temple was announced on April 3, 1976, and dedicated on December 2, 1983 by Gordon B. Hinckley, a counselor in the church's First Presidency. It was the first Latter-day Saint temple built in Mexico. 

When it was designed few temples featured an angel Moroni.  It is one of only 5 temples that have an angel Moroni symbolically holding a record of the ancient peoples in America in the form of gold plates.  A visitors' center was included in the original design, with similar architectural features and a statue of Christ that can be experienced up close.  The grounds are designed with a water display in front, a garden, and are decorated with traditional Mexican plants.

When the temple was built it was property of the Mexican government bound under a law that stipulated all religious buildings should be open to all. However, the Mexican government made an exception to the law to allow the church's normal practice of only allowing members with temple recommends to enter the building. In 1992, Mexican law was reformed and ownership of the building was transferred to the church.

The temple closed March 30, 2007 for renovations that were expected to take up to 14 months. Renovations were completed and the church conducted guided tours of the temple from October 20 through November 8, 2008.  Church president Thomas S. Monson rededicated the temple on November 16, 2008. The temple was again closed for renovations in early 2014. A public open house was held from 14 August through 5 September of 2015, excluding Sundays. The temple was rededicated on Sunday, September 13, 2015 by Henry B. Eyring, a counselor in the First Presidency.

See also

 Ted E. Brewerton, a former temple president
 Comparison of temples of The Church of Jesus Christ of Latter-day Saints
 List of temples of The Church of Jesus Christ of Latter-day Saints
 List of temples of The Church of Jesus Christ of Latter-day Saints by geographic region
 Temple architecture (Latter-day Saints)
 The Church of Jesus Christ of Latter-day Saints in Mexico

Notes

External links

Mexico City Mexico Temple Official site
Mexico City Mexico Temple at ChurchofJesusChristTemples.org

20th-century Latter Day Saint temples
Buildings and structures in Mexico City
Religious buildings and structures completed in 1983
Temples (LDS Church) in Mexico
Mayan Revival architecture
1983 establishments in Mexico